HMS L9 was an L-class submarine built for the Royal Navy during World War I. The boat survived the war and was sold for scrap in 1927.

Design and description
L9 and its successors were enlarged to accommodate 21-inch (53.3 cm) torpedoes and more fuel. They displaced  on the surface and  submerged. The L-class submarines had a crew of 38 officers and ratings.

For surface running, the boats were powered by two 12-cylinder Vickers  diesel engines, each driving one propeller shaft. When submerged each propeller was driven by a  electric motor. They could reach  on the surface and  underwater.

The boats were armed with four 21-inch torpedo tubes in the bow and two 18-inch (45 cm) in broadside mounts. They carried four reload torpedoes for the 21-inch tubes for a grand total of ten torpedoes of all sizes. They were also armed with a  deck gun.

Construction and career
HMS L9 was laid down in October 1916 by William Denny and Brothers at their Dumbarton shipyard, launched on 29 January 1918, and completed on 27 May. She sailed with the Submarine Depot Ship HMS Ambrose (1903) to Hong Kong in 1919 as part of the 4th Submarine Flotilla. The boat was sunk during a typhoon in Hong Kong harbour on 18 August 1923. She was salvaged on 6 September 1923 and then recommissioned. L9 was sold in Hong Kong on 30 June 1927.

Notes

References
 
 
 
 

 

British L-class submarines
Ships built on the River Clyde
1918 ships
World War I submarines of the United Kingdom
Maritime incidents in 1923
Royal Navy ship names